Eli (or Elijah) ben Joseph Chabillo ( or Habillo) was a Spanish philosopher who lived in Monzón, Aragon, in the second half of the fifteenth century. 

He was an admirer of the Christian scholastics, and studied Latin in order to translate into Hebrew some of their works, especially those dealing with psychology. The works which he partly translated and partly adapted (some bearing his name; others, though anonymous, known to be his) were the following 

 By Thomas Aquinas
 Quæstiones Disputatæ, Quæstio de Anima
 De Animæ Facultatibus (Hebrew title Ma'amar be-Kochot ha-Nefesh), published by Adolf Jellinek in Philosophie und Kabbala, Leipzig, 1854
 De Universalibus
 She'elot Ma'amar be-Nimtza ube-Mahut questions on Thomas Aquinas' treatise on being and quality
 By Occam
 Three treatises of Summa Totius Logices to which he added an appendix
 Quæstiones Philosophicæ
 By Aristotle
 De Causa thirty-two premises, with their explanations.

According to Jellinek and Moritz Steinschneider, Chabillo also translated, anonymously, Vincent of Beauvais' De Universalibus under the title Ma'amar Nikbad bi-Kelal.

References

Spanish philosophers
15th-century philosophers
Year of birth unknown
Year of death unknown
15th-century translators
15th-century Spanish writers